Tromina is a genus of sea snails, marine gastropod mollusks in the family Muricidae, the murex snails or rock snails.

Species
Species within the genus Tromina include:

 Tromina dispectata Dell, 1990
 Tromina traverseensis Clarke, 1961: synonym of Lusitromina traverseensis (A.H. Clarke, 1961)

References